Orner is a surname. Notable people with the surname include: 

Eric Orner (born  1965), American cartoonist and animator
Eva Orner, Australian film producer and director
Peter Orner, American writer

See also
Horner
Mörner